Untold Stories is the second studio solo album by the Brazilian musician Heitor Pereira, released in 2001 (see 2001 in music).

Track listing
 Spanish Blues
 Indian Summer
 When Spirits Dance
 Xamego
 Backyard on Sunday
 Passion
 Meu Primeiro Amor
 China
 Cafe
 Afro
 Blues Detour
 Stewart's Vamp
 Sunny Bridge
 Mali
 Two Kids

External links
Heitor Pereira is establishing a reputation for bringing international flavors to mainstream, American scores at cdbaby.com
Untold Stories at yottamusic.com

2001 albums